A Red Orchid Theatre is an Equity theatre company located in the Old Town district of Chicago, founded in 1993 by Michael Shannon, Guy Van Swearingen IV, and Lawrence Grimm. Kirsten Fitzgerald, a long-time ensemble member, has helmed the company as Artistic Director since 2008.

Notable productions
Notable productions include a revival of Sam Shepard's Simpatico, Eugène Ionesco's The Killer, and John Ford's 'Tis Pity She's a Whore. Notable world premieres include Tracy Letts' Bug and Craig Wright's Mistakes Were Made. A Red Orchid is also known for an experimental 1996 production of Arthur Kopit's The Questioning of Nick starring Nick Offerman, Michael Shannon, and Guy Van Swearingen that was performed three times in succession with the actors switching roles each time.

In the summer of 2014, the company took its premiere production of The Opponent by ensemble member Brett Neveu to New York's 59E59 Theaters with the original cast (ensemble members Guy Van Swearingen and Kamal Angelo Bolden), director (ensemble member Karen Kessler) and designers (Joey Wade, Myron Elliott, Joe Court, John Tovar and ensemble member Mike Durst).

In Fall 2017, McCarter Theatre Center presented A Red Orchid's 2013 production of Simpatico. This production featured much of the original cast and crew including Michael Shannon.

Ensemble members
A Red Orchid Theatre's artistic ensemble is composed of actors, designers, directors, and playwrights.

Awards and nominations

MacArthur Award
In 2016, A Red Orchid Theatre became the recipient of the MacArthur Foundation's MacArthur Award for Creative & Effective Institutions. This MacArthur Award included a $200,000 grant to be used to "establish a cash reserve and implement its audience development plan that includes new marketing and audience engagement strategies."

Joseph Jefferson Awards
The company has received many Joseph Jefferson Awards, the highest awards honoring Chicago theatre.

Non-Equity

Equity

References

External links
Official site

Theatre companies in Chicago
Theatres in Chicago
1993 establishments in Illinois